A ghost plane (a term sometimes used interchangeably with ghost flight) may refer to:
 Rendition aircraft, an aircraft used by national governments to move prisoners internationally
 An empty or near-empty flight carried out to preserve a landing slot, or for logistical purposes — to get an aircraft where it needs to be, to support other scheduled flights
 Regarding air crash, a "ghost plane" or "ghost flight" occurs when the plane, already in the air, suffers some type of accident that has incapacitated the crew and passengers due to hypoxia (lack of oxygen), but the aircraft continues to fly thanks to the autopilot until it runs out of fuel and ends up crashing, after getting out of its flight path. These types of accidents are usually caused by slow uncontrolled decompression, which affects cabin pressurization. There have been no survivors in this kind of accident and it is very possible that even landing the plane intact, the damage due to lack of oxygen would be irreparable for those on board. Examples include:
 A Cessna 441 which crashed in 1980 carrying Bo Rein
 1999 South Dakota Learjet crash, of golfer Payne Stewart's Learjet
 2000 Australia Beechcraft King Air crash, Queensland
 Helios Airways Flight 522, 2005
 A Cessna 421C Golden Eagle III which crashed into the Gulf of Mexico in 2012
 2022 Baltic Sea Cessna crash, a Cessna 551 which crashed into the Baltic Sea near Ventspils in 2022
 "Ghost Plane", an episode of Canadian TV series Mayday about Helios Airways Flight 522; see List of Mayday episodes

What was once supposedly a rare occurrence, ghost flights have become more frequent within the last few years. Since the beginning of the pandemic, the term 'ghost flight' has begun to make an appearance within the aviation world. A ghost flight is a term used when airlines operate a regularly scheduled route with a plane containing less than 10% of the airline's total capacity. Some say these flights are unnecessarily adding to the environmental crisis, by contributing to carbon emissions without a significant benefit.

In the beginning of 2019, over 5,000 planes have flown to and from United Kingdom airports with no passengers. In addition, the Civil Aviation Authority (CAA) confirmed that over 35,000 flights had less than 10% of passenger capacity. The reason for these low capacity/empty flights is unknown [to this author]. Airlines are not required to publish data explaining pollution practices. The United Kingdom's biggest airport, Heathrow, accounted for 10,467 flights.

As the COVID pandemic began to spread worldwide in March 2020, flights got cancelled and delayed due to the current restrictions and the unknown. During this time, airline travel was reduced by 45% in 2020. Because of this, airlines had to increase the number of empty flights in order to maintain their airport slots during this time.

Airport Slot Rule- 
In order to maintain an effective airport and keep flights on time, airports have implicated slot rules to ensure flights are able to continue in a timely manner and limit scheduled air traffic. These slot rules also help maximize competition and keep airfares low. Airlines are required to utilize the slots for flights or trade them. If a slot goes unused, the airline must give back to slot so other airlines are able to use it.

Before the COVID restrictions, airlines were required to use their allotted spots at least 80% of the time. During the pandemic, the European Commission temporarily suspended Europe's airport slot rule for a short period. Due to travel restrictions, many flights were cancelled or had limited capacity, which made it difficult for airlines to fulfill all the requirements for possessing an airport slot. The suspension of the slot rule was reinstated in October 2021. After the slot rule was reinstated, the rule only required European airlines to use 75% of their flight slots for the winter season. In the summer of 2023, they plan on getting back on track to pre-pandemic regulations and will be required to fill 80% of airport slots. However, in January 2022 the Lufthansa Group, Europe's second largest airline, estimated that it would need to operate 18,000 ghost flights this winter to be able to keep all their current runway slots. Ghost flights are an example of wastage and unnecessary emissions that there is a need for a slot reform.

As of July 2022, the European Commission adopted a proposal that would allow more flexibility of airline slots. Airlines would be allowed to use expectations in situations such as natural disasters, epidemiological emergencies, or widespread political unrest resulting in disruptive effect on air travel. The proposal went into effect on October 30, 2022.

Climate Issue- 
Aviation is the world's fastest growing source of climate harming emissions. Air travel causes more carbon emission in an hour than any other consumer activity. These emissions contribute to an estimated 2.4% of annual CO2 amount globally. In addition to releasing up to 2.1 million tons of greenhouse gas emissions each year. Research has found that aviation also contributes 4% to human-induced global warming. At this rate, warming is to increase 0.2 degrees Fahrenheit (0.1 degrees Celsius) by the year 2050 as aviation continues to grow post pandemic. Although the pandemic put a pause in the emissions, the CO2 emissions from past flights are still playing a role in global warming. The pandemic slowed the warming rates by about 5 years. Of frequent flyers, there is an elite minority that is contributing to most of the aviation emissions.

As of October 2021, the goal was to achieve net-zero emissions by the year 2050 within the aviation industry. Ghost flights alone are creating lots of environmental damage and account for yearly emissions equivalent to more than 1.4 million cars. If left unchecked, these emissions are a threat to the environment.

References